Dagmar Barnouw (née Heyse, 22 March 1936 – 14 May 2008) was a German cultural historian. From 1988 until her death, she served as professor of German and comparative literature at the College of Letters, Arts and Sciences at the University of Southern California (USC).

The author of 11 books and 150 articles, Barnouw's work included Weimar Intellectuals and the Threat of Modernity (1988); Germany 1945: Views of War and Violence (1997); and The War in the Empty Air: Victims, Perpetrators, and Postwar Germans (2005).

Early life and education
Born in Berlin-Wilmersdorf, Barnouw's family became refugees during World War II after Dresden was bombed. In an essay written just before she died, she recalled: "Packed tightly into an open truck, we clutched our small wet bundles, ourselves shaken like rags by the cold wind and the fear of being flung off the truck. It stopped abruptly; our eyes shut against the heavy rain opened; we looked at the village and knew that it would always have been cut off from the rest of the world. All hopes of leaving here would be nothing but a hazy dream; and trying to get back to where we had come from nothing but a black rock of futility." The family was eventually resettled in Ulm in Baden-Württemberg.

Barnouw completed her first degree in Germany and in 1962 was awarded a Fulbright scholarship to study at Stanford University. In 1968 she obtained a PhD from Yale University for a thesis on the German poet Eduard Mörike. This became her first book, Entzückte Anschauung Sprache und Realität in der Lyrik Eduard Mörikes (1971).

Career

Positions held
In 1977 she became an associate professor at Purdue University, then taught at several universities in the United States and Germany, including Brown University, the University of Texas at Austin, the University of California, San Diego, Heidelberg University, and the University of Pittsburgh. In 1985 she began teaching at USC and became a full professor there in 1988.

Research
Barnouw's work focused on 20th-century Germany, including the suffering of ordinary Germans during and after the Second World War, and the relationship between the war, the Holocaust, and United States involvement in wars in the Middle East. She argued against the idea that the Holocaust should be regarded as unique and in some sense ahistorical. Germanic-studies scholar William Rasch referred to three of her books—Visible Spaces, Germany 1945, and The War in the Empty Air—as her "Arendt trilogy"; the polemics reminded him of Hannah Arendt. Reviewing The War in the Empty Air, political scientist Manfred Henningsen noted Barnouw's "barely contained anger". Barnouw wrote:

That the Holocaust and Auschwitz were regarded as "unique" was understandable in the early post-war years, she wrote, but in the longer term the unquestioned view of World War II as the "good, clean war" and the "absolutely just war" has continued to further Allied interests, particularly American interests. She argued for a reappraisal. The war was fought as if there were "no limits to the destruction of humans". The "empty air" of her book title represents "the spaces of annihilation peopled with millions and millions of the anonymous dead".

Her book Germany 1945: Views of War and Violence (1997) won a Golden Light Award as Photographic Book of the Year, and a Best Critical Photographic Study award from the Maine Photographic Workshop.

Personal life and death
Barnouw married an American academic, Jeffrey Barnouw, in Tübingen, Germany, in 1964. They were both students at the time; he was later a professor of English at the University of Texas at Austin. Their son, Benjamin Barnouw, was born in 1967 and became the deputy attorney-general of California. In April 2008 Barnouw suffered a stroke; she died in hospital in San Diego the following month.

Selected works
Books
Entzückte Anschauung Sprache und Realität in der Lyrik Eduard Mörikes. Munich: Fink, 1971. 
Thomas Mann Studien zu Fragen der Rezeption (with Hans R. Vaget). Bern and Munich: Lang, 1975. 
Elias Canetti. Stuttgart: Metzler, 1979. 
Die versuchte Realität oder von der Möglichkeit, glücklichere Welten zu denken: Utopischer Diskurs von Thomas Morus zur feministischen Science Fiction. Meitingen: Corian, 1985. 
 Weimar Intellectuals and the Threat of Modernity. Bloomington: Indiana University Press, 1988. 
 Visible Spaces: Hannah Arendt and the German-Jewish Experience. Baltimore: Johns Hopkins University Press, 1990. 
 Critical Realism: History, Photography, and the Work of Siegfried Kracauer. Baltimore: Johns Hopkins University Press, 1994. 
 Elias Canetti zur Einführung. Hamburg: Junius Verlag, 1996. 
 Germany 1945: Views of War and Violence. Bloomington: Indiana University Press, 1997. 
Ansichten von Deutschland (1945): Krieg und Gewalt in der zeitgenössischen Photographie. Frankfurt am Main: Strömfeld/Nexus, 1997. 
 Naipaul's Strangers. Bloomington: Indiana University Press, 2003. 
 The War in the Empty Air: Victims, Perpetrators, and Postwar Germans. Bloomington: Indiana University Press, 2005. 

Chapters
"A Time for Ruins", in Wilfried Wilms and William Rasch (ed.). German Postwar Films: Life and Love in the Ruins. Palgrave Macmillan, 2008. 
 "The German War", in Marina MacKay (ed.). The Cambridge Companion to the Literature of World War II. Cambridge: Cambridge University Press, 2009, 98–110.

See also
 Historikerstreit
 Politics of memory
 Vergangenheitsbewältigung

Notes

References

Further reading
"The Battered Face of Germany". Life, 18(23), 4 June 1945, 21–27.
 Barnouw, Dagmar (March 2006). "True Stories: Oprah, Elie Wiesel, and the Holocaust". History News Network.
 Tucker, Carol (2 June 1997). "World War II and Its Aftermath Viewed Through Many Lenses". USC News.

1936 births
2008 deaths
20th-century American historians
20th-century American women writers
20th-century German historians
20th-century German women writers
American women historians
Brown University faculty
German expatriates in the United States
German literary critics
Women literary critics
German literary historians
German women academics
German women historians
Academic staff of Heidelberg University
Northwestern University faculty
Writers from Berlin
Purdue University faculty
Stanford University alumni
University of California, San Diego faculty
University of Southern California faculty
University of Southern California Department of German faculty
University of Pittsburgh faculty
University of Texas at Austin faculty
Professors of German in the United States
Yale University alumni
Historians from California
21st-century American women